Philip John Andrew (born 4 December 1962, Eldoret, Kenya) has been the Archdeacon of Cheltenham since 17 March 2017.

Andrew was educated at King Edward's School, Witley, the University of Nottingham and St John's College, Nottingham; and ordained in 2003. After a curacy at Greyfriars Church, Reading, he was Vicar of St Mary Magdalene, Reigate from 2006 until his appointment as Archdeacon of Cheltenham.

Notes

1962 births
Living people
People educated at King Edward's School, Witley
Alumni of St John's College, Nottingham
Alumni of the University of Nottingham
Archdeacons of Cheltenham